The Ferrari F2007 is a Formula One motor racing car that was constructed by Scuderia Ferrari Marlboro to compete in the 2007 FIA Formula One World Championship. The F2007 was the fifty-third single-seater car which the team have built to use in Formula One. 

The chassis was designed by Aldo Costa, Simone Resta, Tiziano Battistini, Marco Fainello, John Iley and Marco de Luca with Mario Almondo playing a vital role in leading the production of the car as the team's Executive Technical Director and with Giles Simon in charge of the engine and electronics division assisted by David Salters (engine design and development) and Mattia Binotto (engine operations).  

As part of new FIA rules for the 2008 season which included banning driver aids via the introduction of a standard ECU for all teams, the F2007 was the last Ferrari Formula One car to use traction control.  

The car is best known for providing Kimi Räikkönen with his first World Championship title and the team with its first Constructor's title since Michael Schumacher helped them win the 2004 Formula One season. , this is the last Ferrari F1 car to win the drivers' title.

The car was unveiled to the public on January 14, 2007 at Ferrari's Fiorano test track in Maranello, Italy.

Chassis
The chassis was significantly altered from the 248 F1, the car Ferrari used during 2006 to finish as runners-up to Renault in the Constructors' Championship. The wheelbase is 85mm longer, from 3050mm to 3135mm, with the extra length added between the cockpit and front wheels, in order to maximize aerodynamic performance.

Aerodynamics

The launch model was shown with the front and rear wings from the 248 F1. This was to keep various aerodynamic features secret from rival F1 teams.

Mechanicals
The gearbox itself, which is still mounted longitudinally, is fitted with an innovative quick-shift system (seven plus reverse). The suspension adopts a zero-keel configuration, a first for Ferrari. The dropping of the single-keel is most likely due to the departure of previous designer Rory Byrne, whose previous, ultra-successful designs (notably his championship-winning Ferrari and Benetton cars) all featured a single keel.

2007 season livery

Ferrari were the only team to receive tobacco sponsorship for the 2007 season. The team's principal sponsor is Philip Morris International, parent company of Marlboro cigarettes. However, in order to circumvent the European tobacco advertising ban, the car's livery did not feature the brand name. A simple red and white "barcode" was used and, hence the advertising at European Grands Prix was purely through association. Ferrari used 'Marlboro' logos in Bahrain, Monaco and China.

The livery featured significantly less white than in previous years. The cars, driven by Felipe Massa and Kimi Räikkönen, raced with the numbers 5 and 6 respectively as the team finished second in the 2006 Constructors' Championship. Ordinarily, this would mean numbers 3 and 4 for the following season but owing to World Champion Fernando Alonso changing teams to McLaren, Renault received these numbers as Fernando Alonso took his number 1 (and thus, number 2) to his new team.

At the Monaco Grand Prix, Ferrari changed the colour of their cars from Marlboro (light) red to Rosso corsa (racing) red, and kept it for the duration of the season.

Other
The 2007 season was the first in which the use of two different rubber compounds was required during a race.

The Ferrari F2007 is featured in the games Gran Turismo 5, Gran Turismo 5 Prologue, Gran Turismo PSP, F1 2017, F1 2018 , F1 2019 and F1 2020.

Complete Formula One results
(key) (results in bold indicate pole position; results in italics indicate fastest lap)

References

External links

F2007 Website
Secrets of the F2007
Official Scuderia Ferrari Website, F2007

F2007
2007 Formula One season cars
Formula One championship-winning cars